Båtskärsnäs (Kalix language: båstjinäse) is a locality situated in Kalix Municipality, Norrbotten County, Sweden with 296 inhabitants in 2010.

References

External links

Populated places in Kalix Municipality
Norrbotten